The  was an infantry division of the Imperial Japanese Army. It was formed 28 February 1945 in Kumamoto as a square division. It was a part of the 16 simultaneously created divisions batch numbering from 140th to 160th.

Action
Initially, the 146th division was assigned to the 57th army. After the 40th army was transferred from Taiwan to Kyushu, the division was reassigned to it and sent to Kagoshima Prefecture

The 146th division was tasked with the coastal defense. The division did not see any combat until surrender of Japan 15 August 1945.

See also
 List of Japanese Infantry Divisions

Notes and references
This article incorporates material from Japanese Wikipedia page 第146師団 (日本軍), accessed 13 July 2016
 Madej, W. Victor, Japanese Armed Forces Order of Battle, 1937–1945 [2 vols], Allentown, PA: 1981.

Japanese World War II divisions
Infantry divisions of Japan
Military units and formations established in 1945
Military units and formations disestablished in 1945
1945 establishments in Japan
1945 disestablishments in Japan